John Wellwood,  D.D. (died 1670) was a 17th-century English Anglican priest in Ireland.

Wellwood was born in Raphoe and educated at Trinity College, Dublin. He  was Dean of Raphoe from 1661 until his death.

References

17th-century Irish Anglican priests
1670 deaths
Deans of Raphoe